Ilie Subăşeanu (6 June 1906 - 12 December 1980 )  was a Romanian football forward.

Career 

During his career, he has made two appearances and make one goal for the Romania national team.
His career in club football was spent in Olympia București.

External links

References 

Romanian footballers
Romania international footballers
1930 FIFA World Cup players
Sportspeople from Timișoara
People from the Kingdom of Hungary
1906 births
1980 deaths
Association football forwards